Steve Libiih Leo Bessong (born February 10, 1989, in Yaoundé) is a professional Cameroonian footballer currently playing for Fogape Yaoundé.

Career 
He began his career by Dauphins FC and joined than in January 2007 Diósgyőri VTK, after one year joined back to Cameroon and signed by Fogape Yaoundé. Bessong had a try out by Trois-Rivières Attak and Montreal Impact.

References

1989 births
Living people
Cameroonian footballers
Diósgyőri VTK players
Footballers from Yaoundé
Association football forwards